Peter Vernon's Silence is a 1926 Australian silent film directed by Raymond Longford. It was the last film on which Lottie Lyell worked prior to her death in December 1925. It is considered a lost film.

Plot
Peter Vernon's mother dies and he is adopted by a squatter, Kingston, whose son, Philip, is Peter's age. The two grow up and fall in love with the same girl, Marie (Loretta May). Marie loves Philip but her father forbids the marriage because of his dark reputation and Philip kills the old man in a fit of rage.

Peter tries to take the blame by fleeing from the police and is chased through the Snowy Mountains before being caught. He is sent to gaol, and when he gets out Philip confesses to the murder on his death bed. Peter is reunited with Marie.

Production
The film featured location shooting in and around Moss Vale, Mount Kosciuszko, Kiandra, Adaminaby, Leura and the Blue Mountains.

Reception
Despite being distributed by Paramount, the film only earned £1,114 at the Australian box office of which £724 was returned to the producers.

Cast
Rawdon Blandford as Peter Vernon
Walter Hunt as Philip Kingston
Loretta May as Marie
Rene Sandeman
Iris Webster
Beryl Gow
John Faulkner

References

External links

Peter Vernon's Silence at National Film and Sound Archive
Peter Vernon's Silence at AustLit

1926 films
Australian drama films
Australian silent feature films
Australian black-and-white films
Films directed by Raymond Longford
Lost Australian films
1926 drama films
1926 lost films
Lost drama films
Silent drama films